The 2016 Lory Meagher Cup was the eighth staging of the Lory Meagher Cup hurling championship since its establishment by the Gaelic Athletic Association in 2009. The championship began on 23 April 2016 and ended on 4 June 2016.

Fermanagh were the 2015 champions and play in the Nicky Rackard Cup having won promotion.

Table

Table

Round 1

Matches

Round 2

Matches

Round 3

Matches

Round 4

Matches

Round 5

Matches

Final

References

Lory
Lory Meagher Cup